The twelfth series of Warsaw Shore, a Polish television programme based in Warsaw, Poland was announced in July 2019 and began airing on 22 September 2019. The series was filmed in Mielno, making this the second series to be filmed there following the sixth series in 2016. This is the first series not to include two former cast members Klaudia "Czaja" Czajkowska and Klaudia Stec who had quit the show after the previous series and the first to include six new cast members Hungarian celebrity Gábor "Gabo" Szabó, Joanna Bałdys, Paweł Hałabuda, Anna Tokarska, Radosław "Diva" Majchrowski and Sasha Muzheiko, who had previously appeared on the sixth series of Top Model. The series also featured the brief return of Jakub Henke and Wojciech Gola. This was the final series to include cast member Damian "Stifler" Zduńczyk following his decision to quit. It was also later announced that this would be Anna "Mała" Aleksandrzak's last series.

Cast 
 Aleksandr "Sasha" Muzheiko (Episodes 8–13)
 Anastasiya Yandaltsava
 Anna "Mała" Aleksandrzak
 Anna Tokarska (Episodes 4–12)
 Damian "Dzik" Graf
 Damian "Stifler" Zduńczyk
 Ewa Piekut
 Ewelina Kubiak
 Gábor "Gabo" Szabó
 Jakub Henke
 Joanna Bałdys
 Kasjusz "Don Kasjo" Życiński
 Patryk Spiker
 Paweł Hałabuda
 Piotr Polak
 Radosław "Diva" Majchrowski (Episodes 4–13)
 Wojciech Gola (Episodes 11–12)

Duration of cast

Notes 

 Key:  = "Cast member" is featured in this episode.
 Key:  = "Cast member" arrives in the house.
 Key:  = "Cast member" voluntarily leaves the house.
 Key:  = "Cast member" returns to the house.
 Key:  = "Cast member" leaves the series.
 Key:  = "Cast member" returns to the series.
 Key:  = "Cast member" is not a cast member in this episode.
 Key:  = "Cast member" features in this episode as a guest.

Episodes

References 

2019 Polish television seasons
Series 12